Richard Willoughby may refer to 

Richard Willoughby (judge) (died 1325),  Chief Justice of the Common Pleas for Ireland. 
Richard de Willoughby (c. 1290–1362), Lord Chief Justice of England 
Richard Verney, 13th Baron Willoughby de Broke (1693–1752), English peer 
Richard Verney, 19th Baron Willoughby de Broke (1869–1923), English peer